The Hedgehog (also known as an Anti-Submarine Projector) was a forward-throwing  anti-submarine weapon that was used primarily during the Second World War. The device, which was developed by the Royal Navy, fired up to 24 spigot mortars ahead of a ship when attacking a U-boat. It was deployed on convoy escort warships such as destroyers and corvettes to supplement the depth charges.

As the mortar projectiles employed contact fuzes rather than time or barometric (depth) fuzes, detonation occurred directly against a hard surface such as the hull of a submarine making it more deadly than depth charges, which relied on damage caused by hydrostatic shockwaves. During WWII out of 5,174 British depth charge attacks there were 85.5 kills, a ratio of 60.5 to 1. In comparison, the Hedgehog made 268 attacks for 47 kills, a ratio of 5.7 to 1.

Development
The "Hedgehog", so named because the empty rows of its launcher spigots resembled the spines on the back of a hedgehog, was a replacement for the unsuccessful Fairlie Mortar that was secretly tested aboard  in 1941. The Fairlie was designed to fire depth charges ahead of a ship when attacking a submarine. The principle of firing projectiles forwards, instead of dropping depth charges over the stern, was considered viable, despite the failure of the Fairlie. This research by the Directorate of Miscellaneous Weapons Development (DMWD) led to the development of the Hedgehog.

The weapon was a multiple 'spigot mortar' or spigot discharger, a type of weapon developed between the wars by Lieutenant Colonel Stewart Blacker, RA. The spigot mortar was based on early infantry trench mortars. The spigot design allowed a single device to fire warheads of different sizes. The propelling charge was part of the main weapon and worked against a rod (the spigot) set in the baseplate which fitted inside a tubular tail of the 'bomb'. This principle was first used on the Blacker Bombard 29 mm Spigot Mortar and the later PIAT anti-tank weapon.

The adaptation of the bombard for naval use was made in partnership with MIR(c) under Major Millis Jefferis, who had taken Blacker's design and brought it into use with the Army. The mounting initially was fixed, but was later replaced by a gyro-stabilised one to allow for the rolling and pitching of the attacking ship.

The system was developed to solve the problem of the target submarine disappearing from the attacking ship's ASDIC when closer than the sonar's minimum range. The speed of sound in water was such that the time taken for the 'ping' echo to return to the attacking ship from a close-by target submarine became too short to allow the human operator to distinguish the returning audible echo from the initial sound pulse emitted by the sonar – the so-called "instantaneous echo", where the output sound pulse and returning echo merge, with the submarine still out of depth charge range. A submarine in this "blind spot" became effectively invisible to the sonar, allowing it to make evasive manoeuvres undetected. The solution was a weapon mounted on the foredeck that discharged the projectiles up and over the ship's bow while the submarine was still detectable by the sonar, entering the water some distance in front of the ship.

History
The Hedgehog entered service in 1942. Sympathetic detonation of projectiles near those contacting hard surfaces was a possibility, but the number of explosions counted was usually fewer than the number of projectiles launched.

The prototype launcher was tested aboard  in 1941, but there were no submarine kills until November 1942, after it had been installed aboard one hundred ships. Initial success rates, of about 5%, were only slightly better than depth charges. Swells and spray frequently covered the launcher during heavy North Atlantic weather, and subsequent attempts to launch from the soaked launcher were often hindered by firing circuit problems, launching an incomplete pattern. A depth charge total miss would still produce an explosion, leading crews to think that they might have damaged their target or at least demoralised its personnel; a Hedgehog miss was discouragingly quiet. The Royal Navy launched Hedgehog so seldom in early 1943 that a directive was issued ordering captains of ships equipped with Hedgehog to report why they had not used Hedgehog on an underwater contact. The results were blamed on crew inexperience and low confidence in the weapon. However, after an officer from the DMWD was sent to the base at Londonderry, where the escort vessels were based, with better training and shipwide talks on examples of successful Hedgehog attacks, the kill rate improved considerably. By the end of the war, statistics showed that on average, one in every five attacks made by Hedgehog resulted in a kill (compared with less than one in 80 with depth charges).

In response to this new deadly threat to its U-boats, the Kriegsmarine brought forward its programme of acoustic torpedoes in 1943, beginning with the Falke. These new "homing" acoustic torpedoes could be employed effectively without the use of a periscope, providing submarines a better chance to remain undetected and evade counterattack.

In the Pacific Theatre,  sank six Japanese submarines in a two-week period with the Hedgehog in May 1944.

In 1946, the destroyer escort  was destroyed while unloading ammunition when a crewman accidentally dropped a Hedgehog charge near one of her main turret ammunition rooms, triggering three  devastating explosions that wrecked the superstructure.

Operational usage
The launcher had four "cradles", each with six launcher spigots. The firing sequence was staggered so all the bombs would land at about the same time. This had the added advantage of minimising the stress on the weapon's mounting so that deck reinforcement was not needed, allowing the weapon to be easily retrofitted at any convenient place on a ship. Reloading took about three minutes.

The Hedgehog had four key advantages over the depth charge:

 An unsuccessful attack does not hide the submarine from sonar.
 When a depth charge explodes, it can take 15 minutes before the disturbance can settle down enough that sonar becomes effective. Many submarines escaped during the time after an unsuccessful depth charge attack. Since Hedgehog charges only explode on contact, sonar tracking of the submarine is less likely to be disrupted by an unsuccessful Hedgehog attack.
 Proximity weapons (such as depth charges) need to be set for the target's correct depth to be effective. Contact-fuzed charges do not have that limitation, and an explosion at the time predicted for the contact-fuzed projectile to reach the target depth may indicate a "hit".
 However, although knowledge of target depth was less important, the Hedgehog was less successful against deep targets.
 There is no "blind period" allowing the submarine to escape undetected.
 Until depth-finding sonar became available (the first was the Royal Navy's "Q" attachment in 1943), there was a "dead period" during the final moments of a depth-charge attack when the attacker had no knowledge of what the target was doing. U-boat commanders became adept at sharp changes of direction and speed at these moments, avoiding the attack. Weapons such as Hedgehog, usable while the submarine was detectable by sonar, did not give the submarine a period of "invisibility" in which to dodge and evade the attack.
 
 Many depth charges were required to inflict enough cumulative damage to sink a submarine; even then, many U-boats survived hundreds of detonations over a period of many hours—678 depth charges were dropped against  in April 1945. The depth charge, usually exploding at a distance from the submarine, had a cushion of water between it and the target which rapidly dissipated the explosive shock. The Hedgehog's charge, on the other hand, exploded in direct contact with the hull. However, near misses with the Hedgehog were silent and did not cause any damage, unlike the cumulative damage caused by several depth charge near-misses; nor did it have the same psychological effect as a depth charge attack.

Derivatives and successors
In late 1943 the Royal Navy introduced Squid. This was a three-tubed mortar that launched depth charges. Initially it was used as a single weapon, but when this failed to be successful, it was upgraded to the "double squid" that consisted of two launchers placed in parallel. In 1955 this system was upgraded to the three-barreled Limbo that launched  Minol charges.

The United States produced a rocket version of Hedgehog called Mousetrap, then Weapon Alpha as a replacement for both. Still, Hedgehog remained in service with the United States Navy into the Cold War until both Hedgehog and the less satisfactory Weapon Alpha were replaced by ASROC.

Three "Hedgerow" flotillas of specialized Landing Craft Assault boats carrying the Hedgehog instead of troops were used during the Normandy landings. An addition of impact fuse extensions in the projectile noses enabled detonating the warheads above ground. The bombs were used to clear 100-yard-wide paths through mines and barbed wire obstacles on the beach.

The Australian Army adapted the marine Hedgehog into a land-based seven-shot launcher that could be mounted on the back of Matilda tanks.

Weapons derived from the Hedgehog have been largely phased out from Western navies in favor of homing torpedoes. MBU-600 and its derivatives remain an important part of the Russian Navy's (as well as Russia's allies, such as India) anti-submarine arsenal to this day.

Former operators

General characteristics

Ammunition
 Weight: 
 Shell diameter : 
 Shell length: 
 Explosive charge:  TNT or  Torpex
 Range: about 
 Sinking speed: 
 Fuze: Contact, high explosive

Launcher
 Firing order: Ripple in pairs, one every tenth of a second
 Reload time: ~3 minutes

Variants
 Mark 15: pattern as for the Mark 11 but mounted on a platform adapted from that of a quadruple 40 mm Bofors gun mount. The Mark 15 could be fired remotely from the ship's plotting room.

References

External links

 Anti-Submarine Projector Mks 10 & 11 (Hedgehog)

Anti-submarine mortars
British inventions
Explosive weapons
Naval weapons of the United Kingdom
Naval weapons of the United States
World War II mortars
World War II naval weapons of the United Kingdom
World War II naval weapons
Weapons and ammunition introduced in 1942